Ora Thake Odhare ( They Live That Side) is a Bengali language romantic comedy film directed by Sukumar Dasgupta based on a story by Premendra Mitra. This film was released on 5 February 1954 in the banner of S. M. Productions. The music direction was done by Kalipada Sen.

Plot
The story follows the age-old feud between a West Bengali Ghoti family and a Bangal  family from East Bengal. It deals with the friction between two communities that exists for almost eternity. As the narrative moves on, this comedy flick becomes a kaleidoscope of emotions that is synonymous with the people from both sides of Bengal. Finally their fight leads to a love affair between two person.

Cast
 Uttam Kumar
 Suchitra Sen
 Bhanu Bandopadhyay
 Tulsi Chakrabarti
 Chhabi Biswas
 Dhiraj Bhattacharya
 Molina Devi
 Panchanan Bhattacharya
 Bijoy Bose
 Anath Chattopadhyay
 Sarat Chattopadhyay

References

1954 films
Bengali-language Indian films
1950s romantic comedy-drama films
Indian romantic comedy-drama films
Films based on Indian novels
1950s Bengali-language films